The Piliyandala Clock Tower is located in the Piliyandala, Sri Lanka. The clock tower is a popular landmark of the Piliyandala. Having existed for over sixty years, the clock tower is considered to be of considerable archaeological value; thus, the tower provides the Piliyandala town with historical significance.

History 

D. Simon Samarakoon erected the clock tower in memory of his father, Cornelis Wijewickrema Samarakoon, and his mother. The foundation stone for the erection of the clock tower was laid by the  Minister of Local Government C. W. W. Kannangara on 11 September 1952. The construction was completed in seven months and the clock tower was commissioned on 30 April 1953, and has been running ever since.

Features 

The three-tiered clock tower was constructed with brick and cement and has a concrete layer on the topmost floor. The top floor is accessible via an iron staircase within the tower. At the top of the iron staircase, there is a box (1.52m x 1.2m) which houses the clock's three operating machines. These three winding-mechanisms simultaneously operate with a key once a week to power the clock.

A  broad round butte' hangs from a five-foot long supporting bar.

References 

Clock towers in Sri Lanka
Buildings and structures in Colombo
Towers completed in 1953